Highschool of the Dead is an anime series adapted from the manga of the same name written by Daisuke Sato and illustrated by Shoji Sato. The series is set in the present day, beginning as the world is struck by a deadly pandemic that turns humans into zombies. The story follows Takashi Komuro, a student at Fujimi High School who survived the initial outbreak along with several of his classmates and the school nurse, and occasionally jumps to the perspective of other characters. As the group tries to survive the zombie apocalypse, they must also face dangerous fellow survivors and the decay of their own moral codes.

The series is produced by Madhouse and directed by Tetsurō Araki, with series composition by Yōsuke Kuroda, music by Takafumi Wada, character design by Hitomi Ochiai and Masayoshi Tanaka, and art and sound direction by Ayu Kawamoto and Kazuya Tanaka respectively. The series aired on AT-X from July 5, 2010 to September 20, 2010, with later broadcasts on TV Kanagawa, Tokyo MX, Chiba TV, KBS Kyoto, TV Aichi, TV Saitama, and Sun TV. Six DVD and Blu-ray volumes were released by Geneon Universal Entertainment (now NBCUniversal Entertainment Japan) between September 22, 2010 and February 23, 2011.

In North America, the anime is licensed by Sentai Filmworks and simulcasted by Anime Network. The English dub of the series aired on Anime Network's VOD service from March 10, 2011 to May 26, 2011, and was made available on Microsoft's Zune Marketplace and Apple's iTunes Store on May 27, 2011 and June 27, 2011, respectively. Section23 Films later released the complete series on Blu-ray and DVD on June 28, 2011. Outside of North America, the anime is licensed in Australia and New Zealand by Madman Entertainment, with simulcasts available on their video portal, and in the United Kingdom by Manga Entertainment.

An OVA episode of H.O.T.D., entitled "Drifters of the Dead", was bundled with the limited edition of the seventh volume of the manga on Blu-ray April 26, 2011. It was originally intended for a February release, but was pushed back.

The series' opening theme song is "HIGHSCHOOL OF THE DEAD" by Kishida Kyoudan & The Akeboshi Rockets. The series' closing theme songs differ in each episode, and each are sung by Maon Kurosaki. The CD single for the opening theme was released on August 18, 2010 by Geneon Universal Entertainment. A CD containing all 12 ending themes sung by Kurosaki was released by Geneon on September 22, 2010, along with an original soundtrack.

Episode list



References
Episode titles

Specific

External links
Official website 
Official Anime Network website

Highschool of the Dead